Aderonke Adeola is a Nigerian film director, art historian, fashion entrepreneur, script-writer and producer. She won the UNESCO prize at the 2019 African Film Festival for her documentary Awani. She is also a freelance writer for The Guardian and ThisDay newspapers.

Career
Adeola is a graduate of Art history. She had previously worked at the Marketing and Communications at Stanbic IBTC and she was also an associate Producer at RED TV before going into documentary film making. She was an assistant producer on the creation of the novel Half of a Yellow Sun which was adapted into a movie. She directed her first documentary film Awani which won her the UNESCO Prize at the 2019 African Film Festival and an award of merit at the 2019 Impact documentary Awards.

References

External links
 

Living people
Nigerian film directors
Nigerian art historians
Nigerian film producers
Nigerian fashion businesspeople
Year of birth missing (living people)
Nigerian writers
Nigerian women writers
Nigerian women in business
Yoruba women writers
Yoruba women filmmakers
Nigerian businesspeople
Nigerian documentary filmmakers
Nigerian women film producers
Nigerian women film directors